The 2014 Women's National Invitation Tournament was a single-elimination tournament of 64 NCAA Division I teams that were not selected to participate in the 2014 Women's NCAA tournament. The annual tournament began on March 19 and ended on April 5. All games were played on the campus sites of participating schools. The Tournament was won by the Rutgers Scarlet Knights who defeated the UTEP Miners, 56–54, in the championship game before a sellout crowd of 12,222 at the Don Haskins Center in El Paso, Texas.

Participants
64 teams were selected to participate in the 2014 WNIT. 32 teams received automatic berths into the tournament from being the highest-ranked team in their conference that failed to make the NCAA women's tournament. The other 32 teams earned at-large bids, by having a winning record but failing to make the NCAA Women's Tournament.

a

Automatic qualifiers

At-large bids

Bracket

Region 1

Home teams are listed first, unless noted.
* = Overtime
Colorado, Oregon, and UTEP will host 2nd Round games.

Region 2

Home teams are listed first, unless noted.
* = Overtime
Indiana will host Marquette in Round 2.
South Dakota State will host Minnesota in Round 3.

Region 3

Home teams are listed first, unless noted.
* = Overtime
Rutgers and Seton Hall will host Round 2 games.

Region 4

Home teams are listed first, unless noted.
* = Overtime
South Florida will host George Washington in Round 3.

Semifinals and championship game

Home teams are listed first, unless noted.
* = Overtime

All-tournament team
 Kahleah Copper, Rutgers (MVP)
 Tyler Scaife, Rutgers
 Kayla Thornton, UTEP
 Kristīne Vītola, UTEP
 Courtney Williams, South Florida
 Steph Paluch, South Dakota State
Source:

See also
 2014 NCAA Division I women's basketball tournament
 2014 Women's Basketball Invitational
 2014 National Invitation Tournament

References

Women's National Invitation Tournament
Women's National Invitation Tournament
Women's National Invitation Tournament
Women's National Invitation Tournament
Women's National Invitation Tournament